Oberpfaffenhofen is a village that is part of the municipality of Weßling in the district of Starnberg, Bavaria, Germany.

Village
The village is home to the Oberpfaffenhofen Airport  and a major site of the German Aerospace Center (Deutsches Zentrum für Luft- und Raumfahrt, DLR). Oberpfaffenhofen became known to a wide audience when, in 1983, the first West-German astronaut, the physicist Ulf Merbold, flew to space on board a Space Shuttle in a Spacelab mission. These missions were partly supervised by the German Space Operations Center located at Oberpfaffenhofen.

The research center in Oberpfaffenhofen houses the DLR, including the Columbus Control Center which DLR operates for the European Space Agency and Airbus Defence and Space, and also some Fraunhofer Institutes and other scientific institutes. From 2014, OHB group moved the division which formerly was Kayser-Threde, from Munich to Oberpfaffenhofen.

Also situated in Oberpfaffenhofen is the industrial area of (the now insolvent) Dornier Luftfahrt GmbH (later part of Fairchild Dornier). The aircraft manufacturer shared the airfield with the DLR.

During the occupation of Germany the airport was designated Oberpfaffenhofen Air Force Depot which also served as the maintenance depot for the aircraft that were utilized during the Berlin Airlift of 1948–49.

References

External links 
 
 German Aerospace Center Oberpfaffenhofen (DLR)

Starnberg (district)